
Gmina Kolsko is a rural gmina (administrative district) in Nowa Sól County, Lubusz Voivodeship, in western Poland.

Villages
Gmina Kolsko contains the villages and settlements of Głuszyca, Jesiona, Jesionka, Karszynek, Kolsko, Konotop, Lipka, Marianki, Mesze, Sławocin, Strumianki, Strumiany, Święte, Tatarki, Tyrszeliny, Uście and Zacisze.

Neighbouring gminas
Gmina Kolsko is bordered by the gminas of Bojadła, Kargowa, Nowa Sól, Sława and Wolsztyn.

References

Kolsko
Nowa Sól County